The Banks Covered Bridge is a wooden covered bridge in Wilmington Township, Lawrence County, Pennsylvania, United States. It spans the Neshannock Creek southeast of New Wilmington.

Unlike many Pennsylvania counties, Lawrence County never possessed many covered bridges; perhaps only five such bridges were ever built in the county.  Today, only the Banks Covered Bridge and the McConnell's Mill Covered Bridge near Rose Point remain.  While the Howe truss used by the McConnell's Mill bridge is very rare, the Burr arch truss used by the Banks bridge is employed by many Pennsylvania bridges.  Its interior walls are similar to those featured on many covered bridges in Bucks County.

In 1980, the bridge was placed on the National Register of Historic Places in recognition of its historical significance, along with the McConnell's Mill bridge.

References

Further reading
Allen, Richard Sanders.  Covered Bridges of the Middle Atlantic States.  Brattleboro: Stephen Greene, 1959, 73-79.

Bridges completed in 1889
Covered bridges on the National Register of Historic Places in Pennsylvania
Covered bridges in Lawrence County, Pennsylvania
Wooden bridges in Pennsylvania
Bridges in Lawrence County, Pennsylvania
Transportation buildings and structures in Lawrence County, Pennsylvania
Tourist attractions in Lawrence County, Pennsylvania
1889 establishments in Pennsylvania
National Register of Historic Places in Lawrence County, Pennsylvania
Road bridges on the National Register of Historic Places in Pennsylvania
Girder bridges in the United States
Burr Truss bridges in the United States